The sixteen characteristics are an extended elaboration of the Four Noble Truths. For each truth, they describe four characteristics.

Tibetan tradition
The Tibetan tradition emphasizes the study of the sixteen characteristics of the Four Noble Truths, as described in the Abhisamayalamkara. The Mahayana text Ornament of Clear Realization (Abhisamayalamkara) identifies four characteristics of each truth, for a total of sixteen characteristics, which are presented as a guide to contemplating and practicing the four noble truths. The Ornament of Clear Realization is a key text in the curriculum of Tibetan Buddhist monasteries and study colleges, and this method of study and practice is emphasized in the Tibetan tradition.

Description
These sixteen characteristics are identified as follows:

Truth of suffering
These characteristics refer to the five aggregates
impermanence - the five aggregates are impermanent and change from moment to moment
suffering - the five aggregates have come into being because of avidya (ignorance) and kleshas (disturbing emotions), and they are under the influence of the avidya and kleshas
emptiness - there is no "self" outside of the five aggregates that controls or makes use of the five aggregates
selflessness - there is no "self" to be found within the five aggregates that controls or makes use of the five aggregates

Truth of origin
These characteristics refer to karma, kleshas, and avidya (ignorance)
causes - karma, kleshas, and avidya are constantly arising within our mental continuum, and because of their nature they have the quality of being the causes of suffering.
origin - kleshas and karma are the actual origin of suffering, not just intermediate links. 
strong production - avidya, kleshas, and karma act forcefully as the main causes of suffering (they are not just passive ingredients)
condition - avidya, kleshas, and karma are more than just the main causes of suffering, they are also the contributory causes

Truth of cessation
These characteristics refer to cessation
cessation - cessation is the ceasing of all kleshas and avidya forever
pacification - cessation pacifies the torment of suffering, brings true peace
being superb - cessation is supreme in bringing about the source of all health and happiness
definite emergence - cessation will definitely bring us out of samsara

Truth of the path
These characteristics refer to the path
path - the path leads to cessation
awareness - the path leads us to a full and complete understanding of the root of cyclic existence (samsara) and the means to escape it
achievement - through the path, we can definitely achieve the result of liberation and enlightenment
deliverance - the path delivers us from the bondage of our conditioned existence

References

Sources

Buddhist belief and doctrine
Tibetan Buddhist philosophical concepts